Métro (also called Métro Montréal or Journal Métro) is a French-language free daily newspaper published in Montreal, Quebec, Canada. The paper is wholly owned by local businessman Michael Raffoul who owns print media distribution company Transmet. Journal Metro is part of the Metro Media group which owns several local newspapers in Montreal. Journal Métro Montréal was formerly part of the international group of newspapers Metro International.

History
The paper was founded in 2001, by Montreal-based TC Transcontinental which licensed the brand from Metro International, itself founded in 1995. It was part of several Metro free papers across Canada under various licensees. From its inception in 2001, it held a franchise as the sole French-language free daily newspaper to be distributed inside the Montreal Metro system and STM bus terminals

In 2010, Journal Metro lost its franchise as the provider of the sole French-language free daily newspaper across the Montreal transit system to Québecor Média's 24 Heures (24 Hours; originally founded as Metropolitain).

In January 2016, the Réseau de transport métropolitain concluded a five-year agreement with TC Transcontinental making Métro the only free newspaper to be distributed within the Montreal Metro system. This shut out 24 Hours. 

In May 2018, TC Media sold the Montreal edition of Metro, along with several other papers, to Michael Raffoul, who in turn contracted TC Media to print the newspapers. These papers became part of the Metro Media group.

In 2018, all the Metro licensees in Canada apart from Montreal were acquired by Torstar Group, publishers of the Toronto Star, and rebranded as StarMetro, though still in collaboration with the Swedish Metro International media group. This left the Montreal paper the only one with the Metro branding in Canada.

In 2019, Torstar announced that all StarMetro papers would cease publication of paper editions, leaving only an online presence, and some employees would be transitioned to the Toronto Star network to handle the remaining online newspaper publication duties. This leaves the Montreal edition of Metro as the only remaining paper presences of Metro International in Canada.

While considered a daily newspaper. the weekend edition often covers the days Friday to Monday inclusive, especially during the summer months.

With the onset of Covid-19, the newspaper reduced its print edition to three times per week, Tuesdays, Wednesdays and Fridays with the Friday edition being dubbed the Weekend Edition.

References

External links
  

2001 establishments in Quebec
Free daily newspapers
French-language newspapers published in Quebec
Newspapers published in Montreal
Publications established in 2001